Lee Hui-cheng (born 26 November 1967) is a Taiwanese athlete. She competed in the women's javelin throw at the 1984 Summer Olympics.

References

1967 births
Living people
Athletes (track and field) at the 1984 Summer Olympics
Taiwanese female javelin throwers
Olympic athletes of Taiwan
Place of birth missing (living people)